Aetios or Aetius was a Byzantine eunuch official and one of the most trusted advisers of Byzantine empress Irene of Athens (r. 797–802). After Irene's rise to sole rule, Aetios developed an intense rivalry with her eunuch chief minister Staurakios. After Staurakios's death, Aetios became the leading man in the state. He plotted to usurp the throne for his brother, Leo, but lost power when Irene was deposed in 802.

Biography

Early years and rivalry with Staurakios

Aetios first appears in 790, when he was a protospatharios and a confidant of Irene, then the Byzantine empress-mother and regent for her young son, Emperor Constantine VI (r. 780–797). In the autumn of that year, Irene tried to sideline her son and assume full rule over the Byzantine Empire. This, however, caused a mutiny by the army in favour of the young emperor. Constantine was installed as sole ruler, Irene confined to a palace in Constantinople, and her eunuch protégés, including Aetios, were exiled.

Aetios was restored to his position, along with the other eunuchs, when Irene was recalled to power as a co-ruler in 792. In August 797, Irene and her powerful eunuch minister Staurakios succeeded in overthrowing and blinding (and possibly also killing) Constantine, thus assuming governance of the state. However, the uncles of the deposed emperor, the surviving younger sons of Emperor Constantine V (r. 741–775), who had in the past been involved in plots against Irene, were still a potential threat. They were persuaded by sympathizers to seek refuge in the cathedral of Hagia Sophia, where the capital's populace would supposedly rally to them and declare one of them as emperor. No such support materialized; instead, Aetios managed to achieve their surrender, and they were exiled to Irene's home town of Athens.

Irene now divided her favour between Staurakios, her old-established chief minister, and Aetios. This began a period of intense rivalry between the two and their respective supporters, as they raced to place their relatives in positions of power, so as to secure control of the Byzantine Empire after Irene's eventual death. This competition came to the fore in 797/798, and intensified in May 799, when Irene fell seriously ill. Aetios, who had won the backing of Niketas Triphyllios, the commander of the Scholai guards, accused Staurakios before the Empress of plotting to usurp the throne. Irene duly convened a council at the Palace of Hieria where she severely rebuked her favourite minister, but Staurakios escaped with an apology.

Staurakios in turn began to distribute bribes amongst the men and lower officers of the Scholai and Exkoubitores regiments, trying to win their support for an eventual coup. Aetios again went to Irene, who in February 800 forbade anyone from the military to contact Staurakios. Coupled with Aetios's own appointment to the powerful post of strategos of the Anatolic Theme, this restored a precarious balance between the two camps. Soon after, Staurakios became very ill, but he continued plotting against Aetios, instigating a revolt against him in Cappadocia before dying in June 800.

Supremacy and downfall of Aetios
The revolt was quickly and brutally subdued, and with his rival's death, Aetios stood supreme amongst Empress Irene's court. He likely succeeded Staurakios as logothetes tou dromou, while retaining control of the Anatolics and adding to his command the Opsician Theme. He gained a victory in 800 against the Arabs, which was followed, however, by a defeat in 801. In 801/802, Aetios appointed his brother Leo as monostrategos of the themes of Thrace and Macedonia. Controlling thus the armies closest to Constantinople, which comprised about a third of the Byzantine Empire's entire military forces, he was well placed to make Leo emperor. In the words of the chronicler Theophanes the Confessor, he "ruled by [Irene's] side and was usurping power on behalf of his brother". Consequently, in 802, Aetios was instrumental in the rejection of a marriage offer from Charlemagne, which Irene had apparently seriously considered. 

Aetios's plans for his brother's elevation faltered with the opposition of the other courtiers, who resented his influence and the insulting manner with which he treated them. Chief among them were Nikephoros, Irene's finance minister (logothetes tou genikou), but also Niketas Triphyllios, Aetios's former ally, and Leo Sarantapechos, a relative of the Byzantine empress. Fearing an imminent coup by Aetios, the conspirators, in the morning of October 31, 802, entered the Great Palace and acclaimed Nikephoros emperor. Irene was deposed and allowed to retire to a convent.

It is not known what became of Aetios after that. He most likely lost power upon Nikephoros's accession, but he may be the patrikios Aetios who was killed, along with Nikephoros himself, in the Battle of Pliska against the Bulgars on July 26, 811.

References

Sources

8th-century births
9th-century deaths
8th-century Byzantine people
9th-century Byzantine people
Byzantine generals
Byzantine eunuchs
Logothetai tou dromou
Patricii
Governors of the Anatolic Theme